The Aarau–Suhr railway line was a standard gauge railway line in the canton of Aargau, Switzerland. The Swiss National Railway (SNB) opened the Aarau–Suhr and Zofingen–Wettingen lines on 6 September 1877. The line passed to Swiss Federal Railways in 1902. SBB electrified the line from Aarau to  via Suhr on 15 July 1946. SBB closed the line 11 December 2004 to permit the re-routing of the narrow gauge Menziken–Aarau–Schöftland railway line off surface streets. The rebuilt line opened on 22 November 2010.

Notes

References 
 

Closed railway lines in Switzerland
Railway lines opened in 1877
1877 establishments in Switzerland
Railway lines closed in 2004
2004 disestablishments in Switzerland
15 kV AC railway electrification